Robert Edward Kottwitz (born 1950 in Lynn, Massachusetts) is an American mathematician.

Kottwitz studied at the University of Washington (B.A.) and then went to Harvard University, where he received his Ph.D. in 1977 under the supervision of  Phillip Griffiths and John T. Tate (Orbital Integrals on ). In 1976 he was assistant professor and later professor at the University of Washington and went in 1989 as a professor to the University of Chicago.

He was several times at the Institute for Advanced Study in Princeton, New Jersey (for example, in 1976 and 1977).

Kottwitz works in the Langlands program, including harmonic analysis on p-adic Lie groups and automorphic forms and the general linear groups and Shimura varieties.

He is a fellow of the American Academy of Arts and Sciences and the American Mathematical Society (AMS). He was an invited speaker at the International Congress of Mathematicians in Berlin in 1998 (Harmonic analysis on semisimple Lie p-adic algebras).

Writings 

With Diana Shelstad Foundations of Twisted Endoscopy, Astérisque, 255, 1999
With James Arthur, David Ellwood (editor): Harmonic analysis, the trace formula and Shimura varieties, Proc. Clay Mathematics Institute, 2003 Summer School, The Fields Institute, Toronto, June 2003, AMS 2005

References

External links 
Portrait in Chicago Chronicle

20th-century American mathematicians
21st-century American mathematicians
Fellows of the American Mathematical Society
University of Washington alumni
Harvard University alumni
University of Washington faculty
University of Chicago faculty
Fellows of the American Academy of Arts and Sciences
1950 births
Living people
People from Lynn, Massachusetts
Mathematicians from Massachusetts